The National Institute of Statistics is the branch of the Cambodian Ministry of Planning responsible for the collection, processing, and dissemination of official national statistics. It oversees the Social Statistics Department, the Census and Survey Department, the General Statistics Department, and the Economics Statistics Department.

See also
Cabinet of Cambodia
Demographics of Cambodia
List of national and international statistical services

References
http://www.nis.gov.kh/
http://globaledge.msu.edu/countryInsights/country.asp?CountryID=16

External links
Cambodia National Institute of Statistics homepage
Ministry of Planning

Government agencies of Cambodia
Cambodia